Niels Thorshaug (21 November 1875 – 9 October 1942) was a Norwegian veterinarian.

He was born in Løiten. He was hired as district veterinary there in 1903, then became a consultant of the state in 1919. From 1926 to 1941 he headed the State Animal Authority. He was also instrumental in the creation of the Norwegian School of Veterinary Science.

Holth was also noted for stopping several outbreaks of foot-and-mouth disease, as well as his work to eliminate the diseases bovine tuberculosis and brucellosis, together with Halfdan Holth and Lars Slagsvold.

References

1875 births
1942 deaths
People from Løten
Norwegian veterinarians